James Neville Burnett-Herkes (27 February 1912 - 28 June 1979) was a justice of the peace and member of the colonial parliament of Bermuda for the United Bermuda Party for the constituency of Sandys North. He is buried in Saint James Church cemetery, Somerset, Bermuda.

References 

United Bermuda Party politicians
Members of the Parliament of Bermuda
Bermudian justices of the peace
1912 births
1979 deaths